Tancheng is the seat of Pingtan County, in Fuzhou, Fujian, China (PRC) seating its executive, legislature, judiciary, Chinese Communist Party and PSB branches. It is located on Haitan Island.

History

In 1961, Tancheng Commune was established.

In 1980, Chengguan Town was established, which was renamed Tancheng Town in 1982.

On March 29, 2013, a woman surnamed Wen in Tancheng lost 305,000 RMB to someone pretending to be her brother on QQ.

On April 15, 2013, Chen Shixiong was appointed town-level Chinese Communist Party (CCP) secretary of Tancheng at the sixth plenary session of the 12th CCP Pingtan Committee.

On August 8–9, 2015, Typhoon Soudelor brought winds measured at 36.3 meters per second in Tancheng, the highest in downtown Pingtan since 1971.

On September 27–28, 2016, Typhoon Megi brought torrential rains across Pingtan, including Tancheng.

Administrative divisions
The town administers 15 residential communities and 4 village committees:

Residential communities
 Yuanmen
 Youying
 Ruilong
 Chengdong
 Hongshan
 Baohu
 Zhongpu
 Guishan
 Bailu
 Dongmen
 Jialin
 Zhushan
 Xiaohu
 Wujing
 Kanhu

Villages
 Chengbei
 Chengnan
 Chengzhong
 Beimen

Demographics

See also 
 List of township-level divisions of Fujian

References 

Fuzhou
Township-level divisions of Fujian
Towns in China